Unorganized South West Cochrane District is an unorganized area in the Canadian province of Ontario, encompassing the small portion of the Cochrane District, between Black River-Matheson and Timmins, which is not part of either municipality.

The division had a population of zero in the Canada 2011 Census, and a land area of 553.71 square kilometres.

Demographics
Population:
 Population in 2011: 0
 Population in 2006: 0
 Population in 2001: 0
 Population in 1996: 2
 Population in 1991: 0

See also
List of townships in Ontario

References

External links 
 Map of area

Cochrane South West
Geography of Cochrane District